The Ambassador of the United Kingdom to Honduras is the United Kingdom's foremost Diplomatic representative to the Republic of Honduras. 

Until 1945 the UK head of mission in Guatemala was also accredited to Honduras. An embassy was then opened in Tegucigalpa but it was closed in 2003 and from then until 2015, and again from 2019 the British ambassadors to Guatemala were again accredited also to Honduras.

List of heads of mission

Envoy Extraordinary and Minister Plenipotentiary
1946–1949: Rees Fowler
1950–1954: Gerald Stockley
1954–1955: John Coghill
1956–1957: Geoffrey Jackson

Ambassador Extraordinary and Plenipotentiary
1957–1960: Geoffrey Jackson
1960–1963: Richard Tollinton
1963–1969: John Wright
1969–1972: Laurence L'Estrange
1972–1975: David M. Pearson
1975–1978: Keith Hamylton Jones
1978–1981: John Weymes
1981–1984: Colum Sharkey
1984–1987: Bryan White
1987–1989: David Joy
1989–1991: Peter Streams
1992–1995: Patrick Morgan
1995–1998: Peter Holmes
1998–2002: David Osborne
2002–2003: Kay Coombs
2003–2006: Richard Lavers (non-resident)
2006–2009: Ian Hughes (non-resident)
2009–2012: Julie Chappell (non-resident)
2012–2015: Sarah Dickson (non-resident)
2015–2017: Carolyn Davidson (non-resident)

2017–2019: Thomas Carter (non-resident)

References

External links
UK and Honduras, gov.uk

Honduras
 
United Kingdom Ambassadors